Qrendi F.C. was founded in 1955. Through these years the club has competed in the Second and Third Division of the Malta Football Association. In season 2017–2018 they will be playing in Division 1 for the first time in the club's history.

From its Nursery it produced several players and distinct officials who sounded their name throughout the country. Dr. Joe Mifsud, who for many years occupied the post of President of our club, has also occupied the post of President of the Malta Football Association. He is and still lives in Qrendi. Mr. Carmelo Gauci (il-Busby), ex-kit manager of the National Team has also for many years occupied a very important role in the committee as a team manager.
As players, we cannot not mention Joe (il-Faqi) Farrugia who played for Sliema Wanderers and Marsa F.C. He also played against Juventus as a Marsa F.C. player and while in Australia he played with Melita Eagles.

Aldrin Muscat is a Qrendi F.C. Youth product. He played in the Premier League with Zurrieq F.C. and Sliema Wanderers where in 1995/96 he won the Premier League with Sliema Wanderers, finishing top scorer with 18 goals. He also played with other teams like Gozo F.C., Qormi F.C., Msida F.C.

Another player to mention is Mr. Norman Darmanin Demajo (id-Dede) currently occupying the post of President at the Malta Football Association. Norman started playing football with Qrendi F.C. A talent who was immediately spotted by talent scouts of giants Valletta F.C. The following season he was transferred to Valletta F.C. for the sum of LM 700.00 (€1,630.00) which was considered a lot of money in the 1970s and 1980s.

The club experienced some financial problems in 1995, just a year after the team was promoted to Second Division with no losses and just a draw. However 11 years later in 2005/06, a new committee with 10 hardworking and dedicated members was founded. During that season Qrendi F.C. reached the play-offs but failed to be promoted losing all 3 matches. While in the next season 2006/07 Qrendi finished in fifth place just 2 points away from play-offs. In season 2014/5 Qrendi FC managed to secure promotion to Division 2 under coach Demis Paul Scerri. In season 2016/7, for the first time in the club's history, again under coach Demis Paul Scerri, Qrendi managed to secure a historic promotion to Division 1 placing 2nd. In season 2017/2018 Qrendi under the same coach managed to remain in Division 1 finishing 9th place.

In 2010, a 7-a-side synthetic football pitch was inaugurated thanks to UEFA and Malta Football Association, leading our club to start investing in Youth. Currently the Qrendi F.C. Youth Nursery has 50 Youth attending the Nursery. The age groups vary from Under 7 to Under 19.

Current squad

Players

External links
Qrendi F.C. Official Website (Maltese & English)
Qrendi F.C. First Team Website
Malta Football Association Official Website
Maltafootball.com

Association football clubs established in 1955
Football clubs in Malta
1955 establishments in Malta
Qrendi